Andrulis is a Lithuanian language family name. It may refer to:
Greg Andrulis, American soccer coach
Artūras Andrulis, Lithianian basketballer
Viktorija Andrulytė,  Lithuanian yacht racer

Lithuanian-language surnames